Cheyne Gallarde (born 1980) is a queer illustrator, actor and photographer who was born and raised in Hawaii. He is known for his vintage comic style drawings which generally focus on significant figures in the LGBTQ+ community.

Career 
Gallarde is a creator who works in various fields in the arts. He has been chosen by several companies to contribute his illustrations, photographs, and insight. In 2015, he was a guest speaker at a TEDx presentation in Honolulu. Gallarde was also chosen by GLAAD and Adobe to be featured in their pride series "Create Change" which focuses on LGBTQ+ community issues, inspiration, and self-expression.

Photographer 
Cheyne Gallarde was the founder and photographer of Firebird Photography. His photographic work mostly consists of self-portrait series that highlight differences at the individual level.

Illustrator 
Cheyne Gallarde is most commonly known for his comic style illustrations.

Awards 
Cheyne Gallarde is a multi award-winning artist.

Bibliography 

 “Local Books Highlight Family Sunday.” Honolulu Star-Advertiser (HI). Knight-Ridder/Tribune Business News. April 16, 2017.
 "Art Week." Honolulu Star-Advertiser (HI). Knight-Ridder/Tribune Business News. April 15, 2017.
 Nadine Kam. "Best Face Forward." Honolulu Star-Advertiser (HI). Knight-Ridder/Tribune Business News. March 14, 2013.
 "Bobo's Launches Its Limited-Edition LGBTQ+ Artist Series Pride Bars; The Small Batch, Wholesome Snack Brand Is Celebrating Love Year-Round by Donating 100% of Profits to PFLAG and The Center on Colfax to Provide Resources to the LGBTQ+ Community." PR Newswire. May 25, 2021.
 Mindy Pennybacker. "Cataluna's New Book Meant For Family Bonding." Honolulu Star-Advertiser (HI). Knight-Ridder/Tribune Business News. October 23, 2016.
 "Drag Queens, Super Heroes, and Villains... OH MY! This Hawaiian Artist Reimagines Your Favorite LGBTQ+ Icons." The Advocate. April 1, 2021.
 Mark Olsen. "GLAAD and Adobe Release Special Pride-Themed Create Change Interview Series." States News Service. June 29, 2021.
 Nadine Kam. "MTV taps Hawaii artist to showcase Video of the Year Nominees." Honolulu Star-Advertiser (HI). Knight-Ridder/Tribune Business News. September 8, 2019.
 Mindy Pennybacker. "TEDx Localizes Global Conversations." Honolulu Star-Advertiser (HI). Knight-Ridder/Tribune Business News. March 24, 2015.
 “Cheyne Gallarde: Celebrate Our Heroes.” Art Sphere Inc. | Transforming Lives Through The Arts. January 29, 2022. Online.
 Scott Whelden. “Cheyne Gallarde on Channeling His Inner-Everybody.” Honolulu Museum of Art. September 5, 2014. Online.
 Mark, Steven. "Local LGBT Film Fest Soars Over the Rainbow." TCA Regional News. Chicago. TCA Regional News. Chicago. Knight-Ridder/Tribune Business News. August 8, 2019.

References

Further reading 

 Cataluna, Lee. Ordinary Ohana. Bess Press, 2016.

External links 

 Artist's Personal Website: https://cheynerama.com/ 
 "The Power of Nostalgia | Cheyne Gallarde | TEDxHonolulu." TEDx. April 24, 2015. https://www.youtube.com/watch?v=uJZWcKOIZMo
 "Bobo's Cause Bar | 'Pride' Lemon Poppyseed Oat Bar LGBTQ+ Artist Series." 2021. https://eatbobos.com/products/pride-bar-lemon-poppyseed-oat-bar

1980 births
Living people
Wikipedia Student Program
Photographers from Hawaii
American illustrators
American LGBT photographers
LGBT people from Hawaii